Cencenighe Agordino (Ladin: Zenzenìghe) is a comune (municipality) in the Province of Belluno in the Italian region Veneto, located about  north of Venice and about  northwest of Belluno.

Cencenighe Agordino borders the following municipalities: Canale d'Agordo, San Tomaso Agordino, Taibon Agordino, Vallada Agordina.

Twin towns
Cencenighe Agordino is twinned with:

  Massaranduba, Santa Catarina, Brazil, since 2011

References

Cities and towns in Veneto